Wanda Ferraz De Oliveira (born Wanda Bustamante Ferraz; 7 June 1949), is a Brazilian former tennis player.

Ferrez featured in two Federation Cup ties for Brazil in 1975. She lost a doubles dead rubber in Brazil's World Group elimination by Italy, then won a singles rubber in the consolation round against Luxembourg, over Monique Hendel.

At the 1975 Pan American Games in Mexico City she won a silver medal in the women's doubles competition.

References

External links
 
 

1949 births
Living people
Brazilian female tennis players
Tennis players at the 1975 Pan American Games
Pan American Games silver medalists for Brazil
Pan American Games medalists in tennis
Medalists at the 1975 Pan American Games
20th-century Brazilian women
21st-century Brazilian women